Earthsearch: Mindwarp is a 3 part radio series based on the Mindwarp novel by James Follett. This new series was first broadcast on BBC7 from 1 to 15 April 2006 and the episodes were 45 minutes long.

While it has only a loose connection to the Earthsearch series, it sets the stage for it, and contains many familiar plot elements and character traits.

The series was produced by Big Finish Productions who are also noted for their range of Doctor Who audio dramas. A number of Doctor Who actors appear in Mindwarp including Colin Baker (the Sixth Doctor), Nicholas Courtney (Brigadier Lethbridge-Stewart) and India Fisher (Charley Pollard). Coincidentally, Mindwarp is also the name of parts 5 to 8 of The Trial of a Time Lord, a Doctor Who serial featuring Colin Baker as the Sixth Doctor.

Story
Ewen and Jenine live in the domed city of Arama, a space surrounded by rock. The people of the city believe that the universe consists purely of rock, with embedded space. The city is at war with an enemy called Diablo, made up of the people who deny the word of the G.O.D. - a supreme being who controls everything in Arama.

Ewen and Jenine are selected to train as Technicians – responsible for maintaining the machines that Arama needs to function. They are sent to the Centre for early training, where they learn mechanics. They share a room with an older student called Deg.

Ewen has dreams about being in a vast blue dome. He tells Jenine about his dreams, but she shrugs them off. One of the staff at the centre – Technician Father Dadley – tells Ewen about another student who had similar dreams. His name was Simo Belan and he vanished before he completed his training. One night, after another dream, Ewen decides he wants everyone to see what the blue dome looks like and sneaks out of the room during the night. When he returns, he awakes the others to show them what he has done. They see their Chief Technician – Dom Asta Tarrant – trying to break into the control room, where he manages to shut down the lights, an action which results in them breaking. His roommates tell him he will be caught, but he has other things on his mind.

He goes to visit the father of Simo Belan to find out what happen to him, but while he is there, he is arrested. Ewen is sent to prison where he is visited by his mother and brother who come to say goodbye. Ewen’s brother, Tarlon, is due to begin military service, but that is not why they come to say goodbye. A news report said that Ewen was being tried for desecration – a crime punishable by death.

When Ewen is sent to court, his roommate, Deg, who manages to both get Ewen off the major charges of desecration and blasphemy and embarrass the Chief Technician, represents him. Ewen is about to be sentenced when Caudo Inman, First Citizen of Arama, enters. Just as the judge announces that Ewen should be sentenced to five days community service, Inman cuts in and doubles the sentence to ten days. At a party to celebrate, Deg reveals that his Great Uncle, a retired lawyer, supplied his defence.

Ewen’s community service turns out to be military service. On his last night there, Ewen decides to infiltrate the Diablon camp. He is almost discovered and shoots a Diablon guard. When the others do not help the injured guard, he rushes over, only to discover that the guard is in fact his own brother. They both think each other is working for the Diablons. Ewen works out that the army is just where 
Arama sends the people they do not want in society.

During their studies they find evidence that the rock above the city does in fact come to an end, and that there is a large amount of open space above it.

Eventually they manage to leave the city, and find themselves on the surface of the Earth. They discover that Arama is actually a training centre for interstellar missions to discover new habitable planets. Having passed the unwitting test of Arama (escaping to the surface), Ewen accepts the position of commander of the next Challenger mission.

The Challenger 3 mission is launched, and work starts on the project that will lead to the Earth being moved to a new solar system (see Earthsearch).

Cast
Ewen - Leon Parris

Jenine - India Fisher

Caudo Inman - Colin Baker

Kally Solant - Michele Livingston

Dom Asta Tarant - Andy Coleman

Father Dadley - Nicholas Courtney

Deg Calen - Neil Henry

Tarlan - Mark Wright

Simo Belan - Neil Roberts

Minor Characters
Newscaster - Sara Wakefield

Young Tarlan - Julian Richards

Inman's Computer - Romy Tennant

Mr. Belan - Steven Wickham

Policeman - John H. Elson

Chairman of the Court - Steven Wickham

Diablon Guard - Alistair Lock

BBC Radio 4 Extra programmes
British science fiction radio programmes
Big Finish Productions